Try or TRY may refer to:

Music

Albums
 Try (Bebo Norman album) (2014)
 Try!, an album by the John Mayer Trio
  Try Safic aisha  ( 2000).

Songs
 "Try" (Blue Rodeo song) (1987)
 "Try" (Colbie Caillat song) (2014)
 "Try" (Michael Penn song) (1997)
 "Try" (Nelly Furtado song) (2004)
 "Try" (Pink song) (2012)
 "Try" (Pseudo Echo song) (1985)
 "Try" (Rick Astley song) (2018)
 "Try" (Schiller song) (2010)
 "Try (Just a Little Bit Harder)", a song by Janis Joplin from I Got Dem Ol' Kozmic Blues Again Mama!
 "Try", a song by Backstreet Boys from In a World Like This
 "Try", a song by Dolly Parton from Blue Smoke
 "Try", a song by Natasha Bedingfield from the 2010 album Strip Me
 "Try", a song by Nilüfer Yanya from the 2022 album Painless
 "Try", a 1995 song by Pennywise from About Time
 "Try", a 2005 song by The Magic Numbers from The Magic Numbers
 "Try", a song by The xx from the 2012 album Coexist
 "Try (For Good Reason)", a song by Night Ranger from Feeding off the Mojo

Sport 
 Try (rugby), a way of scoring points in rugby league and rugby union
 Try, a conversion or way of scoring points in American and Canadian football

Television
 "Try" (The Killing), an episode of The Killing
 "Try" (The Walking Dead), an episode of The Walking Dead

Other uses
 Turkish lira's ISO 4217 code
 Try, a 2006 novel by Lily Burana
 Try, a statement used in the exception handling syntax of several computer languages
 Try, boiling fat, such as in a whaling operation, to produce oil

People with the name

Given name 
 Try Bennett (born 1975), retired Costa Rican footballer
 Try Hamdani (born 1994), Indonesian footballer
 Poa Try, Cambodian politician
 Try Sutrisno (born 1935), 6th vice president of Indonesia

Surname 

 Try Chheang Huot (died 2015), Cambodian politician
 Kjetil Try (born 1959), Norwegian executive and writer

See also
 
 Trie, an ordered tree data structure